Alan James Beith, Baron Beith,  (born 20 April 1943) is a British Liberal Democrat politician who represented Berwick-upon-Tweed as its Member of Parliament (MP) from 1973 to 2015.

From 1992 to 2003 he was Deputy Leader of the Liberal Democrats. By 2015 he was the longest-serving member of his party's House of Commons delegation, and was the last Liberal Democrat MP to have experience of Parliament in the 1970s.

Beith was elevated as a life peer in the 2015 Dissolution Honours List and took his title and a seat on the House of Lords Opposition benches on 23 November 2015.

Early life 

The son of John Beith, of Scottish extraction, he was born in 1943 at Poynton in Cheshire.  He was educated at The King's School, Macclesfield before going to Balliol College, Oxford, where he read Philosophy, Politics and Economics graduating in 1964. He then pursued postgraduate studies at Nuffield College receiving a Bachelor of Letters (BLitt) degree.

In 1966, Beith began his career as a politics lecturer in the University of Newcastle upon Tyne.  In 1969 he was elected as a Councillor on Hexham District Council and, in 1970, he was also elected to Corbridge Town Council. He contested Berwick-upon-Tweed as the Liberal candidate at the 1970 general election but was heavily defeated by the sitting Conservative MP Antony Lambton.

Parliamentary career 
Beith became a member of the North Tynedale District Council in 1973. Later that year, Antony Lambton resigned as an MP following a Fleet Street exposé. At the ensuing by-election on 8 November 1973, Beith was narrowly elected by 57 votes, becoming Berwick's first Liberal MP since 1945.

Just three months after his by-election success, Beith was out canvassing his constituents again at the February 1974 general election, being returned to Parliament with an increased majority of 443. Later that same year and still less than a year after entering the House of Commons, Beith had to contest the constituency for a third time in less than a year at the October 1974 general election, retaining his seat with a slender majority of 73 votes. He held his seat with comfortable majorities in the eight further elections he stood in.

Deputy Leader of the Liberal Party 

Beith was appointed to the BBC Advisory Council in 1974, and served as a member until 1984. On the election of David Steel as Liberal Leader in 1976, Beith became the Party's Chief Whip in the Commons. After the 1983 general election, he was appointed Liberal Spokesman for Constitutional Affairs. He was elected as Deputy Leader of the Liberal Party in 1985, in both cases continuing his duties as a Commons Chief Whip.

After the 1987 general election, Beith concentrated his efforts as Liberal Spokesman for Treasury Affairs and stood down from being Liberal Chief Whip after eleven years in post. In 1988, the Liberal and Social Democratic parties merged, initially as the Social and Liberal Democrats.

Deputy Leader of the Liberal Democrats 

Beith stood against Paddy Ashdown in the first leadership election in 1988, an election which Ashdown won by a large margin. Beith stayed on as Deputy Leader of the Liberal Democrats following the 1992 general election under Ashdown until 2003, and was sworn of the Privy Council in 1992. In 1994, he became the Liberal Democrat Home Affairs spokesperson and continued in post under Charles Kennedy's leadership. After the 2001 general election he briefly became Lib Dem spokesperson for the Lord Chancellor's Department, but left the Lib Dem frontbench in 2002, though remaining its Deputy Leader until the following year.

After standing down from the Lib Dem frontbench he chaired the Commons Constitutional Affairs, and Justice Committees. Following Sir Menzies Campbell's resignation as Leader of the Liberal Democrats on 15 October 2007, Beith was encouraged to stand as a prospective compromise candidate for the Lib Dem leadership. However, via his personal website, he announced his decision not to stand for election as party leader.

Later developments 
On 19 May 2009, Beith was the first MP to declare his candidacy to succeed Speaker Michael Martin, who stood down from the position on 21 June 2009. Beith pledged he was "willing to take on the task of leading reform" were he elected as Commons Speaker. Conservative MP John Bercow won, becoming the 23rd Speaker of the House Commons of the United Kingdom.

Beith was knighted in the 2008 Birthday Honours.

On 22 May 2009, Beith was reported by The Daily Telegraph to have claimed £117,000 in second home allowances while his wife, Baroness Maddock, claimed £60,000 Lords expenses for sharing the same address.

Replying in writing on both their behalf to The Telegraph journalist's exposé: "It would be quite wrong for the taxpayer to pay twice for the same costs, so we have shared the costs, either by sharing the cost of rent, or by my wife using her allowance towards costs incurred (she normally claims only half the Lords' overnight allowance)", he argued in defence.

Coalition Government 
At the May 2010 general election he was returned as MP for Berwick; however, his majority was reduced by a substantial swing to the Conservatives.

Beith served as Chairman of the Commons Justice and of the Liaison Select Committees until retiring in 2015.

He was one of only four Liberal Democrat MPs to vote against the third reading of the Marriage (Same Sex Couples) Bill. He was the only Liberal Democrat MP to oppose recognising Palestine as a state in the Commons vote on 13 October 2014.

Beith campaigned throughout his years in the House of Commons for the A1 road to be made a dual carriageway in Northumberland.

Elevation to the House of Lords 
On 7 August 2013, Beith announced that he would retire as an MP at the next election, having at that point represented Berwick-upon-Tweed for 42 years. He was announced as a life peer in the 2015 Dissolution Honours and was created Baron Beith, of Berwick-upon-Tweed in the County of Northumberland on the afternoon of 19 October.

Politics 
Beith is more left-leaning and liberal in social issues, and more right-leaning and conservative economically.

Taxes 
Beith has only voted for reducing VAT once, on 13 December 2008; from then on he voted for raising it. Beith supports higher taxes for alcohol. He always voted against a mansion tax. He also has voted for reducing capital gains tax and corporation tax. He has voted for raising the threshold for paying income tax.

Social 
He voted against the Marriage (Same Sex Couples) Act 2013 in its third reading. Beith also voted for smoking bans and against a hunting ban. He supports lowering the voting age to 16. The Liberal Democrats generally support assisted dying; he has voted against it.

Personal life 
Beith was married in 1965 to Barbara Ward, and they had a son and a daughter. His first wife died in 1998, and he then married in 2001 Diana Maddock (née Derbyshire), formerly MP for Christchurch (1993–97).

Until her death on 26 June 2020, Lord Beith and Baroness Maddock divided their time between homes at Berwick-upon-Tweed, Northumberland, and London SW1; they were one of the few married couples both titled in their own right. Lord Beith serves as President of the Liberal Democrat Christian Forum and of the Historic Chapels Trust, a charity he helped to found and of which he was Chair of Trustees between 2001 and 2014. He is also President of Northumberland Hospital Radio and of the National Liberal Club.

He reportedly speaks French, Norwegian, Swedish and Welsh, and is a keen supporter of heritage matters.

Honours 
Life peer (2015)
Knight Bachelor (2008)

Honorary doctorates:
 Hon DCL (Newcastle)
 Hon DCL (Northumbria)
 Hon DHL (Earlham).

References

External links 

Profile at the Liberal Democrats

Profile at New Statesman "Your Democracy"
www.burkespeerage.com: MADDOCK, LP

|-

|-

|-

|-

1943 births
Living people
English people of Scottish descent
People from Berwick-upon-Tweed
People from Poynton
People educated at The King's School, Macclesfield
Alumni of Balliol College, Oxford
Alumni of Nuffield College, Oxford
Academics of Newcastle University
Politics of Northumberland
Councillors in Northumberland
Liberal Democrats (UK) MPs for English constituencies
Liberal Democrats (UK) life peers
Life peers created by Elizabeth II
Liberal Party (UK) MPs for English constituencies
Members of the Privy Council of the United Kingdom
Knights Bachelor
Spouses of life peers
UK MPs 1970–1974
UK MPs 1974
UK MPs 1974–1979
UK MPs 1979–1983
UK MPs 1983–1987
UK MPs 1987–1992
UK MPs 1992–1997
UK MPs 1997–2001
UK MPs 2001–2005
UK MPs 2005–2010
UK MPs 2010–2015
Politicians awarded knighthoods